Iranattus is a genus of jumping spiders only found in Iran. It has two described species: Iranattus principalis and Iranattus rectangularis.

Name
The genus name is combined from Iran and the common ending for salticid genera -attus.

References

Salticidae
Endemic fauna of Iran
Salticidae genera
Spiders of Asia